Georges Davy (31 December 1883, Bernay – 27 July 1976, Coutances) was a French sociologist. He was a student and disciple of Émile Durkheim. With Marcel Mauss and Paul Huvelin he pioneered anthropological studies of the origins of the idea of contract.

Works
 (ed.) Émile Durkheim: choix de textes avec étude du système sociologique by Émile Durkheim. 1911.
 Le droit, l'idéalisme et l'expérience, 1922
 La foi jurée: étude sociologique du problème du contrat: la formation du lien contractuel, 1922
 (with Alexandre Moret) Des clans aux empires; l'organisation sociale chez les primitifs et dans l'Orient ancien, 1923
 Éléments de sociologie, 1929.
 Sociologues d'hier et d'aujourd'hui, 1931
 (ed.) Leçons de sociologie by Émile Durkheim. 1950.
 Thomas Hobbes et J.J. Rousseau, 1953.
 L'homme; le fait social et le fait politique, 1973

References

Further reading
 Roger Cotterrell, Emile Durkheim: Law in a Moral Domain Edinburgh: Edinburgh University Press / Stanford: Stanford University Press, 1999, ch. 8 (on Davy, Mauss and Huvelin).

1883 births
1976 deaths
French sociologists
French male writers
20th-century French male writers